Kakabeka Falls Airport  is located  northeast of Kakabeka Falls, Ontario, Canada.

The airport is home to the Kakabeka Falls Flying Club and Ron Wilson, the designer of the award-winning Acrolite series of amateur built aircraft.

References

Registered aerodromes in Ontario
Transport in Thunder Bay District